Katokopia ( []) is a village located in the Nicosia District of Cyprus, 7 km east of Morphou. De facto, it is under the control of Northern Cyprus.

Originally inhabited by Greek Cypriots, since the Turkish invasion in 1974, the village has been solely inhabited by Turks.

Culture, sports, and tourism
Turkish Cypriot Zümrütköy Sports Club was founded in 1975, and now in Cyprus Turkish Football Association (CTFA) K-PET 2nd League.

Katokopia is the original home of Greek Cypriot football club Doxa Katokopia.

References

External links
 
 

Communities in Nicosia District
Populated places in Güzelyurt District
Greek Cypriot villages depopulated during the 1974 Turkish invasion of Cyprus